David Duncalf (1934–2003) was an English born, Canadian international lawn bowler.

Bowls career
He won a silver medal in the fours at the 1986 Commonwealth Games in Edinburgh with Dan Milligan, Dave Brown and Dave Houtby.

He won five Canadian National championships and his wife Alice Duncalf won nine national championships.

Personal life
He emigrated from England in 1953, married Alice in 1971 and was an estimator for a number of construction firms. In 1989 he played a major role in the reconstruction of the Empress Hotel.

References

Canadian male bowls players
English male bowls players
Bowls players at the 1986 Commonwealth Games
Commonwealth Games silver medallists for Canada
Commonwealth Games medallists in lawn bowls
1934 births
2003 deaths
Medallists at the 1986 Commonwealth Games